Homex is a Mexican construction and real estate company engaged in the development, construction and sale of affordable entry-level, middle-income and tourism housing in Mexico and Brazil. Founded in Culiacán in 1989, the company is headquartered in Culiacán and it is listed in the Mexican Stock Exchange.

The company is also one of the homebuilders with the greatest geographical diversity in the country and has a leading position in the four most important markets in the country: the Metropolitan Area of Mexico City, Guadalajara, Monterrey and Tijuana.

History 

Homex was formed in 1989 at Culiacán, Sinaloa. Its initial focus was commercial construction. In the early 1990s, the company expanded into other states, and began work in affordable housing construction. In 1999, ZN Mexico Funds acquired a minority stake.

In 2002, the company received  a major investment of $32 million from Sam Zell, through his Equity International Investment Fund. In the mid 2000s, Homex grew rapidly, expanding production from 5,000 homes a year to over 50,000 homes per year. Homex went public in 2004, with shares dual-listed on the New York Stock Exchange and Mexican Stock Exchange; the offering raised $141 million. The company issued a private offering of US$250 million in Senior Guaranteed Notes in 2005, and a secondary public offering of approximately 46 million shares of its common stock in 2006.

After acquiring rival builder Casas Beta through a merger in 2005, Homex became the largest homebuilder in Mexico in terms of operating profit and net income. In the late 2000s, the company expanded into international, tourism-related, and government infrastructure development. Equity International divested in 2008.

Starting in 2011, Homex started a transition towards vertical construction in Mexico.

In 2014, Homex was delisted from the New York Stock Exchange.

Activities 
The company is engaged in affordable entry-level, middle-income and tourism housing, public infrastructures, such as prison facilities.

Homex consists of four divisions: Mexico Division, International Division, Government Division and Tourism Division.
Currently (2011.12.31), the Company owns such subsidiaries as Casas Beta del Centro S de RL de CV, Hogares de Noroeste SA de CV, Homex Amueblate SA de CV, Homex Global SA de CV, Sofhomex SA de CV SFOMER, Homex Atizapan SA de CV and Altos Mandos de Negocios SA de CV, among others.

Governance 
Here is a list of Desarrolladora Homex's senior officers and directors (2013.9.20):
 Eustaquio Tomas de Nicolás Gutiérrez, chairman of the board
 Gerardo de Nicolás Gutiérrez, chief executive officer
 Carlos Moctezuma Velasco, chief financial officer
 Ramón Lafarga Bátiz, administrative and accounting
 Ana Cristina Herrera Lasso Espinosa, human resources and social responsibility vice
 Alberto Menchaca Valenzuela, vice president — Mexico Division
 Ruben Izabal Gonzalez, president — Construction
 Carolina Silva Sanchez, vice president — Tourism Division

Controversies 
As 2017, the company has a bankruptcy protection (concurso mercantil) process  by a record debt of 98 billions of Mexican pesos, be the largest liability recognized by a company that enters this legal figure.

In 2017, Homex settled fraud charges filed by the U.S. Securities and Exchange Commission. The settlement included a provision banning Homex from US-based exchanges for 5 years.

References

External links 
Official Website

Companies listed on the Mexican Stock Exchange
Real estate companies of Mexico